The University of Western Australia Torpedoes Water Polo Club is an Australian club water polo team that competes in the National Water Polo League.  They have a men's team and a women's team and are based at University of Western Australia. The UWA torpedoes won their first ever NWPL grand final in 2016.

References

External links
 

University of Western Australia
Sporting clubs in Perth, Western Australia
Water polo clubs in Australia
University and college sports clubs in Australia
Sports clubs established in 1990
1990 establishments in Australia